Sunday Olawale Fajinmi is a Nigerian politician and an entrepreneur.

Education 
Fajinmi completed his higher education at Teesside University and went on to provide national services as a member of the National Youth Service Corps (NYSC) while employed at Nigeria Airways.

Career 
Fajinmi was elected Senator for the Osun West constituency of Osun State, Nigeria at the start of the Nigerian Fourth Republic, running on the Alliance for Democracy (AD) platform. He took office on 29 May 1999.

Political career 

Senator Sunday Olawale Fajinmi was elected a Senator in 1998 representing Osun west senatorial district on the platform of the United Nigeria Congress Party (UNCP) during General Sani Abacha's military regime. 
After democracy was restored, in June 1999 he was again elected Senator, Osun west on the platform of the  Alliance for Democracy beating Isiaka Adetunji Adeleke of the People's Democratic Party.

While in the senate, he was appointed to the Science & Technology, Transport, State & Local Government (Vice Chairman), Information, Government Affairs and Economic Affairs committees.
In December 2005 he moved over to the ruling People's Democratic Party (PDP).

Fajinmi was the Alliance for Democracy gubernatorial candidate in the 9 August 2014 Osun State election.

References 

Members of the Senate (Nigeria)
Living people
Yoruba politicians
Osun State
Alliance for Democracy (Nigeria) politicians
1952 births
20th-century Nigerian politicians
21st-century Nigerian politicians